A list of notable mountaineers from Slovenia:

Č
 Tomo Česen, (1959-)

F

 Jure Franko, (?)

G
 Tadej Golob, (?)
 Janja Garnbret

H
 Tomaž Humar, (1969–2009)

J
 Janez Jeglič (1961–1997)
 Dušan Jelinčič (1953– )
 Klement Jug, (1898–1924)

K
 Silvo Karo, (1960–) 
 Marjan Keršič, (?)
 Pavle Kozjek, (1959–2008) 
 Julius Kugy, (1858–1944)

M
 Mina Markovič, (1987- )

P
 Marko Prezelj, (1965– )

S
 Janez Skok, (?)

Š
 Igor Škamperle, (1962– )
 Bojan Šrot, (1960– )
 Domen Škofic

V 
 Miha Valič, (1978–2008)

Z
 Janez Zorko, (1937– )

References

 
Mountain
Slovenia